The 1947 Tennessee A&I Tigers football team represented Tennessee Agricultural & Industrial State College as a member of the Midwest Athletic Association (MAA) during the 1947 college football season. In their fourth season under head coach Henry Kean, the Tigers compiled a perfect 10–0 record, won the MAA championship, and outscored opponents by a total of 293 to 58. The team was also recognized as black college national champion for the second consecutive season.

Tennessee A&I had an enrollment of 2,204 students in the fall of 1947.

Schedule

References

Tennessee A&I
Tennessee State Tigers football seasons
Black college football national champions
College football undefeated seasons
Tennessee A&I Tigers football